Anton Jongsma (born 13 January 1983 in Utrecht, Netherlands) is a Dutch-Curaçaoan footballer who currently plays for WKE in the Dutch Topklasse.

External links
 
 
 Profile at VI 

1983 births
Living people
Dutch footballers
Dutch people of Curaçao descent
Dutch Antillean footballers
Netherlands Antilles international footballers
Curaçao footballers
Curaçao international footballers
Eredivisie players
Eerste Divisie players
Derde Divisie players
FC Groningen players
SC Veendam players
PEC Zwolle players
RKC Waalwijk players
Association football midfielders
Footballers from Utrecht (city)
Dual internationalists (football)
WKE players
Achilles 1894 players